Reason is the second studio album by the Belgian recording artist Selah Sue. Distributed by Warner Music Group, it was released by Because Music on March 26, 2015.

Track listing

Notes and sample credits
 denotes co-producer

Charts

Weekly charts

Year-end charts

Certifications

In 2016, it was awarded a gold certification from the Independent Music Companies Association, indicating sales of at least 75,000 copies throughout Europe.

References 

2015 albums
Albums produced by Hudson Mohawke
Because Music albums
Selah Sue albums